Andy Hartzell is a cartoonist who lives in Oakland, California. In 1995, he was awarded a Xeric Grant to publish his book Bread & Circuses. In 2007, Hartzell published Fox Bunny Funny, which was reviewed favorably by The New York Times and the San Francisco Examiner. He was a designer for the game developer Telltale Games from January 2008. Hartzell is also a co-founder of a minicomics distributing company called Global Hobo Distro.

Works
Hatzell's graphic novel Fox Bunny Funny is about the forbidden desires, violence, and psychological distress within foxes and bunnies. This book was published by Top Shelf Productions in the summer of 2007.

Appearances
Hartzell's comics have appeared in a number of publications, including Boy Trouble and The Book of Boy Trouble.

References 

Year of birth missing (living people)
American cartoonists
Living people
Artists from Oakland, California
Place of birth missing (living people)
LGBT comics creators
21st-century LGBT people